José Manuel Mesarina Mayorga (born 15 November 1988) is a Peruvian footballer who plays primarily as a right back. He most recently played for Cienciano in the Torneo Descentralizado.

Club career
José Mesarina was promoted from Alianza Lima's youth team to the first team in 2007. However, he did not make a league appearance for Alianza that season.

Then later that same year in July, Mesarina joined rivals Sporting Cristal on a free transfer. There he made his league debut in the Torneo Descentralizado on 20 September 2007
in a derby match against his former side Alianza Lima. He played from the start and was later replaced for Damián Ismodes in the 68th minute of the match, which finished in a 1–2 defeat at home.

References

External links

1988 births
Living people
Sportspeople from Callao
Association football fullbacks
Peruvian footballers
Club Alianza Lima footballers
Sporting Cristal footballers
José Gálvez FBC footballers
Alianza Atlético footballers
Peruvian Primera División players